Robert Keane may refer to:

 Robert Emmett Keane (1883–1981), American actor
 Bob Keane (1922–2009), American music producer
 Robbie Keane (born 1980), Irish professional footballer

See also
Robert Kean (1893–1980), New Jersey Congressman